Speed skating at the 1984 Winter Olympics was held from 9 to 18 February. Nine events were contested at Zetra Ice Rink.

Medal summary

Medal table

East Germany topped the medal table with four gold medals, and eleven total, including a complete sweep of gold and silver medals in the four women's events.

This was only the second Games in which the United States did not win a speed skating medal, and as of 2018, the only time since 1960 the Netherlands did not win a medal in the sport. Japan's Yoshihiro Kitazawa won his country's first Olympic medal in speed skating.

East Germany's Karin Enke led the individual medal table, winning a medal in each of the women's events, finishing with two golds and two silvers. Canada's Gaétan Boucher was the most successful male skater, with two gold medals and a bronze.

Men's events

Women's events

Records

No men's records were broken in Sarajevo, but all four women's Olympic records were bettered, and there was one world record set as well.

Participating NOCs

Twenty-four nations competed in the speed skating events at Sarajevo. The British Virgin Islands and Yugoslavia made their debuts in the sport.

References

 
1984 Winter Olympics events
1984
1984 in speed skating